This article displays the rosters for the participating teams at the AfroBasket 2017. The player ages are as of September 8, 2017, which was the first day of the tournament.

Group A

DR Congo

Group B

Central African Republic

Morocco

Uganda

Group C

Guinea 

|}
| valign="top" |
Head coach
 Ousmane Tafsir Camara
Assistant coaches
 Ansoumane Toure

Legend
Club – describes lastclub before the tournament
Age – describes ageon 9 September 2017
|}

Rwanda

Group D

Senegal 

|}
| valign="top" |
Head coach
 Porfirio Fisac
Assistant coaches
 Dame Diouf

Legend
Club – describes lastclub before the tournament
Age – describes ageon 9 September 2017
|}

Mozambique 

|}
| valign="top" |
Head coach
 Joseba Martin
Assistant coaches
 Cesar Mujui

Legend
Club – describes lastclub before the tournament
Age – describes ageon 9 September 2017
|}

Egypt

South Africa

References

External links 
Official website

2017
squads